Mill Brook flows into West Canada Creek north of Herkimer in Herkimer County, New York.

References

Rivers of New York (state)
Rivers of Herkimer County, New York